Eugenio María de Hostos Airport  is a public use airport  north of Mayagüez, a coastal city in Puerto Rico. The airport is named after Mayagüez native Eugenio Maria de Hostos. It offers limited, domestic commercial service, subsidized by the Essential Air Service program.

History 
Eugenio María de Hostos Airport used to be the main air gateway to the western region of Puerto Rico, until Rafael Hernández Airport in Aguadilla took over that position.

The airport was served during the 1960s from San Juan by Caribair, and then, rather heavily, by the Puerto Rican national air carrier, Prinair, during the 1970s and early 1980s. It took the airport three years to get commercial service again after Prinair went bankrupt in 1984. American Eagle opened service from Luis Muñoz Marín International Airport in 1987, and Eastern Air Lines, not to be outdone by their rival American's feeder carrier, soon began services there too, with their own feeder airline, Eastern Metro Express.

Although the airport has always been a turbo-prop aircraft airport, Pan Am announced, in 2002, intentions to install jet flights between Mayagüez and Las Américas International Airport in Santo Domingo, Dominican Republic, with Boeing 727s. Those plans never became a reality, but in 2003, the airport gained international status, when Fina Air picked up the route to Santo Domingo. Fina Air has since gone out of business.

On November 8, 2004, American Eagle filed a 90-day notice of intent to the DOT to end service to Mayagüez on February 5, 2005 due to poor loads. MAZ is an Essential Air Service market therefore American Eagle's service was extended by the DOT until the newly selected carrier, Cape Air, began operations. American Eagle ended operations on April 30, 2005.

Facilities and aircraft 
Eugenio María de Hostos Airport covers an area of 172 acres (70 ha) at an elevation of 28 feet (9 m) above mean sea level. It has one runway designated 9/27 with an asphalt surface measuring 4,998 by 100 feet (1,523 x 30 m).

Airline and destination

Accidents and incidents 
 American Eagle Flight 5452 crashed while landing on May 8, 1987, killing two and damaging the airport perimeter fence.
 On June 7, 1992, American Eagle Flight 5456, a CASA C-212 aircraft from San Juan crashed one mile short of runway 9, killing all five people on board.
 A 24-year-old pilot, Jose O. Torres Lopez, sustained an eye injury when his Piper Cub aircraft, carrying him and one passenger, was overthrown by wind after landing at the airport on Saturday, March 1, 2014. The airplane was also damaged.

See also 

 Transport in Puerto Rico
 List of airports in Puerto Rico

References

Further reading 

 Essential Air Service documents (Docket OST-2004-19622) from the U.S. Department of Transportation:
 90-Day Notice (November 5, 2005): of Executive Airlines, Inc. d/b/a American Eagle of intent to terminate service at Mayaguez, P.R.
 Order 2004-12-19 (January 4, 2005): requests proposals for providing essential air service at Mayaguez, Puerto Rico, and/or Ponce, Puerto Rico, with or without subsidy requirements; prohibits Executive Airlines from suspending service at Mayaguez, at the end of its 90-day notice period and requires it to maintain 14 nonstop round trips a week between Mayaguez and San Juan, through March 7, 2005, or until a carrier capable of providing reliable essential air service actually begins service, whichever occurs first.
 Order 2005-3-2 (March 7, 2005): selecting Hyannis Air Service, Inc., d/b/a Cape Air to provide essential air service (EAS) at Mayaguez and Ponce, Puerto Rico, for the two-year period through April 30, 2007; establishing an annual subsidy rate of $688,551, beginning when the carrier inaugurates service at Mayaguez; and establishing an annual subsidy rate of $622,056 for service at Ponce, retroactive to January 1, 2005.
 Order 2007-4-18 (April 20, 2007): selecting Hyannis Air Service, Inc., d/b/a Cape Air to provide essential air service (EAS) at Mayaguez and Ponce, Puerto Rico, for the two-year period through April 30, 2007; establishing an annual subsidy rate of $688,551, beginning when the carrier inaugurates service at Mayaguez; and establishing an annual subsidy rate of $622,056 for service at Ponce, retroactive to January 1, 2005.
 Order 2009-3-1 (March 3, 2009): re-selecting Hyannis Air Service, Inc., d/b/a Cape Air, to continue to provide subsidized essential air service (EAS) at Mayaguez and Ponce, Puerto Rico, for the two-year period beginning May 1, 2009, at the annual subsidy rates of $980,980 for Mayaguez and $740,416 for Ponce.
 Order 2011-3-28 (March 22, 2011): re-selecting Hyannis Air Service Inc., operating as Cape Air, to provide essential air service (EAS) using 9-seat Cessna 402 aircraft at Mayaguez, Puerto Rico, for the five-year period beginning May 1, 2011, through April 30, 2016, for an annual subsidy of $1,198,824.

External links 
 SkyVector - Eugenio Maria De Hostos Airport
 
 
 

Buildings and structures in Mayagüez, Puerto Rico
Airports in Puerto Rico
Essential Air Service